The Kawanishi K6K was a prototype Japanese training aircraft built by the Kawanishi Aircraft Company in the late 1930s.

Design
The K6K was a 2-seat twin-float biplane with a welded steel-tube fuselage, covered in fabric, light alloy and steel wing covered in fabric and monocoque floats built from light alloy. It was conceived in response to an Imperial Japanese Navy requirement for an intermediate-level training seaplane. The first flight of the K6K occurred on 30 April 1938, but flight tests revealed poor alighting characteristics, so the K6K was not ordered into production.

Specifications (K6K)

References

K06K, Kawanishi
K06K
Biplanes
Single-engined tractor aircraft